The James Holes House is a property in Fargo, North Dakota, United States, that was listed on the National Register of Historic Places in 1987.

Description and history 
It was built in 1879 in Italianate style, and was designed and/or built by Pray Brothers.

The property was covered in a study of North Side Fargo MRA.

References

Houses in Fargo, North Dakota
Houses completed in 1879
Houses on the National Register of Historic Places in North Dakota
Italianate architecture in North Dakota
National Register of Historic Places in Cass County, North Dakota
1879 establishments in Dakota Territory